is a passenger railway station located in Totsuka-ku, Yokohama, Kanagawa Prefecture, Japan, operated by the East Japan Railway Company (JR East).

Lines
Higashi-Totsuka Station is served by the Shōnan-Shinjuku Line and the Yokosuka Line. It is located 36.7 km from the terminus of the Yokosuka Line at Tokyo Station. The station is located on the Tōkaidō Main Line, but trains operating on the Tōkaidō Main Line do not stop at Higashi-Totsuka.

Station layout
The station consists of a single island platform with two tracks. The station buildings are built above the platforms. The station has a Midori no Madoguchi staffed ticket office.

The Yokosuka line and Shōnan-Shinjuku Line share the same platforms. There are another two sets of tracks to the either side of the platform. One set is used for the through traffic of the Tōkaidō Main Line, and the other set is for non-stop freight trains.

Platforms

History
Higashi Totsuka Station opened as a station on the Japanese National Railways (JNR) on October 1, 1980, after local residents had petitioned the government for a railway station for over a half century. The opening coincided with the separation of the tracks for the Tōkaidō Main Line and Yokosuka Line into two separate sets of tracks from Yokohama through Ofuna Station.

Passenger statistics
In fiscal 2019, the station was used by an average of 44,389 passengers daily (boarding passengers only).

The passenger figures (boarding passengers only) for previous years are as shown below.

Surrounding area
 Aurora Mall, in front of the train station, houses Aeon and Seibu stores.
Yokohama City Kawakami Kita Elementary School
 Yokohama City Kawakami Elementary School
 Yokohama City Shinano Elementary School

See also
 List of railway stations in Japan

References

External links

 

Railway stations in Kanagawa Prefecture
Railway stations in Japan opened in 1980
Yokosuka Line
Tōkaidō Main Line
Shōnan-Shinjuku Line
Railway stations in Yokohama